Tony Kern (born 1969) is a Singapore-based American film director, screenwriter, motion picture artist and film producer.

Early life and education
Kern attended Gibsonburg High School in Ohio, United States, and graduated from the Bowling Green State University.

Career
Kern began his career in film at Northwestern University as a video editor from 1996 to 2002. From 2003 to 2005, he worked as a producer and editor at AOL-Time Warner prior to setting up film-production company Mythopolis Pictures with Singaporean television news presenter Genevieve Woo. He also owns stock-footage company TK Time-Lapse, which features high-resolution royalty-free stock time-lapse footage.

Kern’s debut film A Month of Hungry Ghosts was released in Singapore on August 7, 2008. The feature film was nominated for Best Film at the inaugural Singapore Film Awards as part of the 22nd Singapore International Film Festival.

His second film, Afterimages, was released in Singapore on September 11, 2014. Co-produced by Genevieve Woo, the horror film is a compendium of five short films and received funding from the Media Development Authority's production assistance grant. In 2012, the film's script won the Network of Asian Fantastic Films award at a competition in Bucheon, South Korea. Afterimages was supported by crowdfunding and crowdsourcing. Reviewing the NC16 film in The Straits Times, critic John Lui gave it three-and-a-half stars, praising its special effects and writing that the film "has the courage of its own horror convictions", while the "good work is undermined by shaky acting from younger, more inexperienced cast members".

Filmography

Filmography as director

Feature film
A Month of Hungry Ghosts (2008)
Afterimages (2014)

Short films
The Mitre Spell (2007)
Robot Man (2006)
Dead Bitch Army
Stay
Steel Skies
The Spooky Incident
Like A Ghost
Godzilla vs. Ameritech & Grandpa’s Truck
Salvation Army Mural Occurrence

Other works
Chasing Echo Music Sound Tracks
Garage Kubrick – Sonic Wallpaper Scenes Music Sound Tracks
Pan Music Sound Tracks
El Nino Music Sound Tracks
Plot Points of a Futuristic Urban Noir Music Sound Tracks

References

External links

 Mythopolis Pictures Official Website
 TK Time-Lapse Official Website
 A Month of Hungry Ghosts Official Website

Profiles
 
 Tony Kern on mythopolis.com
 Tony Kern on hungryghostsmovie.com

1969 births
American film directors
American film producers
American male screenwriters
Singaporean film directors
Singaporean film producers
English-language film directors
Bowling Green State University alumni
Living people